The 1822–23 United States Senate elections were held on various dates in various states. As these U.S. Senate elections were prior to the ratification of the Seventeenth Amendment in 1913, senators were chosen by state legislatures. Senators were elected over a wide range of time throughout 1822 and 1823, and a seat may have been filled months late or remained vacant due to legislative deadlock. In these elections, terms were up for the senators in Class 2.

The Democratic-Republican Party continued to maintain almost complete control of the Senate.

Factions 
At the very end of the next Congress, the 1824 United States presidential election led to a contingency election, decided by the Congress. In that election, Senators split into factions in support of William H. Crawford, Andrew Jackson, or John Quincy Adams and Henry Clay.  Even though that election wasn't held until more than two years after the Senate elections in this article, those factions are noted below as "Crawford," "Jackson," or "Adams-Clay."

Results summary 
Senate party division, 18th Congress (1823–1825)

 Majority party: Democratic-Republican (32–33)
 Minority parties: National Republican & Federalist (4–5)
 Total seats: 48

Change in composition

Before the elections 
Composition after the January 24, 1822 Delaware special election.

Result of the regular elections

Race summaries 
Bold states link to specific election articles.

Special elections during the preceding Congress 
In these special elections, the winners were seated during 1822 or before March 4, 1823; ordered by election date.

Races leading to the next Congress 

In these regular elections, the winner was seated on March 4, 1823; ordered by state.

All of the elections involved the Class 2 seats.

Special elections during the next Congress 
In these special elections, the winners were elected in 1823 after March 4; ordered by election date.

Alabama

Alabama (regular) 

Incumbent William R. King was first elected in 1819. He was reelected with the votes of over 41% of the legislators, defeating William Crawford, former agent to the Choctaw nation John McKee, and another candidate named William King.

Alabama (special) 

Incumbent John Williams Walker resigned on December 12, 1822 due to failing health. He would die in April of the following year. William Kelly was elected in his place with 56.65% of the votes of state legislators, defeating state representative John McKinley.

Delaware

Delaware (regular) 

The Delaware General Assembly did not elect a candidate to the United States Senate.

Delaware (special) 

Federalist incumbent Outerbridge Horsey retired in the 1820/1821 Senate elections. The Delaware General Assembly failed to elect a successor. Caesar Augustus Rodney, the U.S. representative for Delaware's at-large congressional district and a nephew of founding father Caesar Rodney, was elected late.

Georgia 

Incumbent Democratic-Republican Nicholas Ware was reelected in 1823.

Illinois 

Incumbent Democratic-Republican Jesse B. Thomas was reelected in 1823.

Kentucky 

Incumbent Democratic-Republican Richard Mentor Johnson was reelected in 1823.

Louisiana 

Incumbent Democratic-Republican Henry S. Johnson was reelected in 1823

Maine 

Incumbent Democratic-Republican John Chandler was reelected in 1823.

Maryland (special) 

Incumbent Democratic-Republican William Pinkney died on February 25, 1822. Congressman Samuel Smith, a Democratic-Republican, was elected to the seat on December 17, 1822.

Massachusetts

Massachusetts (regular) 

Incumbent Federalist James Lloyd was reelected in 1822 after being first elected in a special election (see below).

Massachusetts (special) 

Incumbent Senator Harrison Gray Otis resigned on May 30, 1822 to run for Mayor of Boston. Former senator James Lloyd, a Federalist was elected on June 5, 1822.

Mississippi 

Incumbent Democratic-Republican Thomas Hill Williams was reelected in 1823.

New Hampshire 

Incumbent Democratic-Republican David L. Morril retired. Governor of New Hampshire Samuel Bell was elected as a Democratic-Republican.

New Jersey

New Jersey (regular) 

Incumbent Democratic-Republican Mahlon Dickerson was reelected in 1823.

New Jersey (special) 

Incumbent Democratic-Republican Samuel L. Southard resigned on March 3, 1823 to become the U.S. Secretary of the Navy. Democratic-Republican Joseph McIlvaine was elected to finish his term on November 12, 1823.

North Carolina 

Incumbent Democratic-Republican Montfort Stokes was defeated for reelection by John Branch, a fellow Democratic-Republican, in 1822.

Ohio (special) 

Incumbent Jeffersonian Republican William A. Trimble died on December 13, 1821 at the age of 35. Governor of Ohio, Ethan Allen Brown, was elected to finish Trimble's term.

Rhode Island 

Incumbent Democratic-Republican Nehemiah R. Knight was reelected in 1823.

South Carolina 

Incumbent Democratic-Republican William Smith lost reelection to Democratic-Republican Robert Y. Hayne.

Tennessee 

Former senator and general Andrew Jackson defeated incumbent John Williams in the election for Senate. Jackson was put up as the Jacksonian candidate after Williams decided to support William H. Crawford in the 1824 Presidential Election. Williams was endorsed by Davy Crockett. Jackson's return to the senate after nearly 25 years out of office marks the second longest gap in service in U.S. Senate history. Jackson would resign two years later in 1825, and eventually be elected president in 1828.

Virginia

Virginia (regular) 

After being elected in the special election (see below), incumbent John Taylor was reelected in 1823.

Virginia (special) 

Incumbent James Pleasants resigned on December 15, 1822 to become Governor of Virginia. Former senator John Taylor, a Democratic-Republican, was elected with 51.8% of the votes of legislators over former congressmen Henry St. George Tucker and John Tyler, both Democratic-Republicans.

See also
 1822 United States elections
 1822–23 United States House of Representatives elections
 17th United States Congress
 18th United States Congress

References

 Party Division in the Senate, 1789-Present, via Senate.gov